del Junco is a Spanish surname meaning “from the reeds”. The most notable family with this name is the Rodrigo del Junco family which originally came from Asturias, Spain.  In the 16th century they immigrated to St. Augustine, Florida and then in the mid 17th century to Matanzas, Cuba.  Their home in Matanzas was the Palacio de Junco and is now a museum.  They also owned the Palmar de Junco  where in 1874, the first game of baseball was played in Cuba. The Matanzas del Junco family have a large crypt in the Necropolis de San Carlos Borromeo.

Some notable descendants of Rodrigo del Junco are

Carlos del Junco, is a renowned Cuban-Canadian harmonica musician.
Mauricio J. Tamargo, lawyer and 14th Chairman of the Foreign Claims Settlement Commission
Pedro Junco was a famous Cuban composer.
Tirso del Junco-Mesa surgeon and U.S. Republican leader in California.
Tirso del Junco-Bobadilla,  is a renowned Cuban-American surgeon.
Max Borges-del Junco, architect
Max Borges-Recio, architect

General references

 Historia de Familias Cubanas (Ediciones Universal, Miami, Florida 1985)

Particular Reference to
Alonso del Portillo-del Junco
 Historia de Familias Cubanas (Ediciones Universal, Miami, Florida 1985 ) 
 Origenes - Compendio Historico Genealogico del Linea Zayas Descendencia del Infante Don Jaime de Aragon (Zayas Publishing, 2003) 
Alonso del Portillo-Marcano
Historia de Familias Cubanas (Ediciones Universal, Miami, Florida 1985 )
Directorio Social de la Habana 1948, (P. Fernandez y Cia S.A.) 
 Origenes - Compendio Historico Genealogico del Linea Zayas Descendencia del Infante Don Jaime de Aragon (Zayas Publishing, 2003) 
Alonso J. del Portillo-Tamargo
 Historia de Familias Cubanas (Ediciones Universal, Miami, Florida 1985 ) 
 Origenes - Compendio Historico Genealogico del Linea Zayas Descendencia del Infante Don Jaime de Aragon (Zayas Publishing, 2003) 
 Directorio Social de la Habana 1948, (P. Fernandez y Cia S.A.) 
 http://www.alpha66.org/ 
 https://web.archive.org/web/20070610233626/http://www.miami-dadeclerk.com/public-records/searchresult2.asp?page=1
Alonso R. del Portillo
 Pedro and Me: Friendship, Loss, and What I Learned by Judd Winick (2000; Henry Holt & Co.)
 Historia de Familias Cubanas (Ediciones Universal, Miami, Florida 1985 ) 
 Origenes - Compendio Historico Genealogico del Linea Zayas Descendencia del Infante Don Jaime de Aragon (Zayas Publishing, 2003) 
 The International Jesuit Alumni Directory Belen (Bernard C. Harris Publishing Company Inc, 2004) MCNH-W54-4-4.OVA, page 74
 The International Jesuit Alumni Directory Belen (Forum Press Inc., 1994), page 254
 Belen Jesuit Prep Echoes Vol. XVI, 1978, Taylor Publishing Company, page 208
 Belen Jesuit Prep Echoes Vol. XV, 1977,  page 174
 The Miami Herald - March 5, 1990 - LOCAL
 The Miami Herald - January 7, 2000 - DIVORCES

Spanish families